Simharasi  is a 2001 Telugu-language film directed by V. Samudra and produced by R. B. Choudary. It stars Rajasekhar and Sakshi Shivanand. It is a remake of the Tamil film Maayi.

Plot
Narasimharaju is a well-respected, do-gooder in a village. He considers women in the village as his sisters and even helps financially to conduct their weddings. He is a man who is ready to kill his father Irulandi when he learns that he had a second wife. But the father opts to kill himself rather than face his son and so, Narasimharaju brings his stepsister Lakshmi to live with him. A local MLA comes to Narasimharaju to obtain his support during the upcoming election, but he refuses and the MLA loses the election. But his son, who admires Narasimharaju, marries Lakshmi. Meanwhile, Bhuvaneswari, Narasimharaju's distant relative's daughter comes to the village from Bangalore and she initially misunderstands Narasimharaju by seeing his looks but later realizes her mistake after knowing about Narasimharaju's hard work and his help towards improving the village. Narasimharaju has built free hospital, day care center, college etc. to help the villagers. Bhuvaneshwari is attracted towards Narasimharaju and proposes him but Narasimharaju does not accept her love. But Bhuvana remains confident about marrying Narasimharaju following which he tells his flashback. Narasimharaju was born into a very poor family where his mother was infected by leprosy even before Narasimharaju's birth. Due to poor financial condition, his mother could not be treated in hospital and instead was kept alone in a room. She was not allowed to touch her son Narasimharaju fearing chances of the disease being spread. Narasimharaju has never seen his mother right from his childhood as she always stays in a closed room. When Narasimharaju was eight years old, his mother is further frustrated more as her disease prevents her to show her affection towards Narasimharaju and she drowns herself in a river. This shocks Narasimharaju and he decides not to marry any woman as he does not want any girl to touch his body which was even untouched by his beloved mother.

Narasimharaju convinces Bhuvaneshwari to marry someone else. Also, Narasimharaju discovers that his stepsister Lakshmi is being tortured by her husband and it was all a plan to take revenge on Narasimharaju for not supporting the local MLA during elections. Narasimharaju beats up Lakshmi's husband and says that he will never support criminal activities even if it impacts his family. On the day of Bhuvaneshwari's wedding, the bride groom's family misunderstands that Narasimharaju and Bhuvaneshwari are lovers seeing Narasimharaju's dhoti in her room and stops the marriage. Bhuvaneshwari's friend discloses the truth that Narasimharaju gave his dhoti to safeguard her when her dresses were washed away in water sometime back. Manorama who also belongs the village shouts at the groom's family for their cruel thoughts and she requests Narasimharaju to marry Bhuvaneshwari as that would be the right thing. Narasimharaju obeys Manorama's words as his mother's and marries Bhuvaneshwari.

Cast

 Rajasekhar as Narasimharaju 
 Sakshi Shivanand as Rajeswari
  Anandaraj as Vijayendra Prasad
  Vindhya
 Varsha
 Vijayakumar
 Giribabu
 Brahmanandam as Ram brahmmam
 M S Narayana as Loose basavayya
 Achyuth as Hari Prasad
Venu Madhav
Manorama
Narra Venkateswara Rao
Kovai Sarala
Chalapathi Rao
Ponnambalam
Bandla Ganesh
  Sai_Kiran

Soundtrack

Music was composed by S. A. Rajkumar and released on Aditya Music. Except for three new songs (Pedalante, Sathyabhama and Telusa), only two songs (Rani Rani and Amma Ane) from the original film Maayi was retained. Pedalante and Sathyabhama was remade from Rajkumar's own songs Pachcha Mannu and Kumbakonam Sandhai from Tamil film of same name. Telusa Nesthama was remade from Rajkumar's own song "Enakkoru Snehithi" from Priyamaanavale.

References

2001 films
2000s Telugu-language films
Telugu remakes of Tamil films
Films scored by S. A. Rajkumar
2001 directorial debut films
Films directed by V. Samudra
Super Good Films films